Basil of Ancyra (Βασίλειος), was a Christian priest in Ancyra, Galatia during the 4th century.  Very meager information about his life is preserved in a metaphrastic work: “Life and Deeds of the Martyred Priest Basil.” He fought against the pagans and the Arians. Basil defended Bishop Marcellus against the prelate being deposed by the Arians.

Suda write that he was the bishop of Ancyra and physician by trade.

Basil was caught up in the persecution of Julian the Apostate. He was arrested, tortured, and executed on June 28/29, 362.

He is commemorated as a martyr on March 22 in the West and East. He is sometimes confused with the other Basil of Ancyra who was not a priest and who is commemorated on January 1.

See also
Photinus
Panarion

References

External links

Year of birth missing
362 deaths
4th-century bishops in Roman Anatolia
People from Ankara
4th-century Romans
4th-century Christian saints

 See pages 207ff in "Victories of the Martyrs" by St. Alphonsus de Liguori